Climate change in Indiana encompasses the effects of climate change, attributed to man-made increases in atmospheric carbon dioxide, in the U.S. state of Indiana. 
 
According to the United States Environmental Protection Agency, "Indiana's climate is changing. Most of the state has warmed about one degree (F) in the last century. Floods are becoming more frequent, and ice cover on the Great Lakes is forming later or melting sooner. In the coming decades, the state will have more extremely hot days, which may harm public health in urban areas and corn harvests in rural areas". In May 2019, The Kansas City Star noted that although it was not yet possible to say whether climate change was contributing to the increasing number of tornadoes in the region, "the band of states in the central United States ... that each spring are ravaged by hundreds of tornadoes — is not disappearing. But it seems to be expanding", resulting in a higher frequency of tornadoes in states including Indiana.

Indiana is one of the ten states that produce half of all greenhouse gas emissions in the US.

Environmental impacts

Heavy precipitation and flooding
"Changing the climate is likely to increase the frequency of floods in Indiana. Over the last half century, average annual precipitation in most of the Midwest has increased by 5 to 10 percent. But rainfall during the four wettest days of the year has increased about 35 percent, and the amount of water flowing in most streams during the worst flood of the year has increased by more than 20 percent. During the next century, spring rainfall and average precipitation are likely to increase, and severe rainstorms are likely to intensify. Each of these factors will tend to further increase the risk of flooding".

Ohio River

"Flooding occasionally threatens both navigation and riverfront communities, and greater river flows could increase these threats. In 2011, a combination of heavy rainfall and melting snow caused flooding along the Ohio and Wabash rivers in Southern Indiana and closed the lower Ohio River to navigation. Although springtime in Indiana is likely to be wetter, summer droughts are likely to be more severe. Higher evaporation and lower summer rainfall are likely to reduce river flows. The drought of 2005 caused portions of the lower Ohio River to be closed to commercial navigation, which delayed shipments of crops and other products to and from upstream states like Indiana. In 2012, a drought caused navigation restrictions on the lower Mississippi River, which cost the region more than $275 million".

Great Lakes

"The ice-free season along the Great Lakes is also becoming longer. Between 1994 and 2011, reduced ice cover lengthened the shipping season on the lakes by eight days. The Great Lakes are likely to warm another 3° to 7°F in the next 70 years, which will further extend the shipping season. In Lake Michigan, the changing climate is likely to harm water quality. Warmer water tends to cause more algal blooms, which can be unsightly, harm fish, and degrade water quality. Severe storms also increase the amount of pollutants that run off from land to water, so the risk of algal blooms will be greater if storms become more severe. Increasingly severe rainstorms could also cause sewers to overflow into the lake more often, threatening beach safety and drinking water supplies".

Economic and social impacts

Agriculture

"Changing the climate will have both beneficial and harmful effects on farming. Longer frost-free growing seasons and higher concentrations of atmospheric carbon dioxide would increase yields for some crops during an average year. But increasingly hot summers are likely to reduce yields of corn and possibly soybeans. Seventy years from now, much of Indiana is likely to have 5 to 15 more days per year with temperatures above 95°F than it has today. More severe droughts or floods would also hurt crop yields".

Air pollution and human health

"Rising temperatures can harm air quality and amplify existing threats to human health. Warmer weather can increase the production of ground-level ozone, a pollutant that causes lung and heart problems. Ozone also harms plants. In rural Indiana, ozone levels are high enough to significantly reduce yields of soybeans and winter wheat. EPA and the Indiana Department of Environmental Management have been working to reduce ozone concentrations".

"Midwestern cities like Indianapolis are vulnerable to heat waves, because many houses and apartments lack air conditioning, and urban areas are typically warmer than their rural surroundings. In recent decades, severe heat waves have killed hundreds of people across the Midwest. Heat stress is expected to increase as climate change brings hotter summer temperatures and more humidity. Certain people are especially vulnerable, including children, the elderly, the sick, and the poor".

Responses

Climate organizations and resilience efforts 
Earth Charter Indiana has worked to develop leadership in sustainability and climate action for almost 20 years. Its Youth Power Indiana initiative works with students in elementary through high school, and with mayors and municipal officials to develop sustainability and resiliency programs. Young people have advocated climate policy which has been adopted in seven cities: Carmel, Indianapolis, Lawrence, South Bend, Goshen, Bloomington and West Lafayette.

Indiana Project Drawdown has assembled information on hundreds of local groups in the state which are making progress on emissions reduction.

Publicly available data is available to communities and government via the Hoosier Resilience Index, an online database listing information such as "precipitation, flood plain and land use maps – for every community in the state of Indiana."

Carbon Neutral Indiana (CNI) is a non-profit organization that works with households, businesses, and academic institutions to measure, offset, and reduce their carbon footprint. Their goal is to spark a movement amongst Hoosiers to ensure Indiana becomes carbon neutral as soon as possible.

See also
 List of U.S. states and territories by carbon dioxide emissions
 Plug-in electric vehicles in Indiana

References

Further reading
 —this chapter of the National Climate Assessment covers Midwest states (Illinois, Indiana, Iowa, Michigan, Minnesota, Missouri, Ohio, and Wisconsin).

Indiana
Environment of Indiana